1st Corps or Quyết thắng Corps (literally: Determined Victory Corps) is one of the four regular army corps of the People's Army of Vietnam (PAVN). First organised in 1973 during the Vietnam War, 1st Corps had a major role in the 1975 spring offensive that ended the war. Today the corps is stationed in Tam Điệp, Ninh Bình.

 Commander: Senior Colonel Trương Mạnh Dũng
 Political Commissar: Major General Nguyễn Đức Hưng

History

In 1972, after the failure of the air raid in Operation Linebacker II, the Federal government of the United States was forced to sign the Paris Peace Accords, according to which in 1973 the United States had to withdraw all troops home. However, the military situation in 4th Military Region of the People's Army of Vietnam is also unfavorable. The Central Military Commission of the Communist Party of Vietnam sent a few divisions that were suffering heavy losses to the North to reinforce.

In July 1973, the Central Committee of the Communist Party of Vietnam after its 21st conference issued a resolution of strengthening the armed forces to unify the country. In executing the issue, three months later the Ministry of Defence and the Central Military Commission approved the plan of organising regular army corps for the Vietnam People's Army. On October 24, 1973, General Võ Nguyên Giáp, Minister of Defence, signed the edict No. 142/QĐ-QP that led to the establishment of the 1st Corps in Tam Điệp, Ninh Bình. The first headquarters of the corps was composed of party committee secretary (bí thư) Lê Quang Hòa and commander (tư lệnh) and deputy secretary Lê Trọng Tấn.

After the PAVN victory in the Battle of Ban Me Thuot in March 1975, 1st Corps was ordered to move to Southern Vietnam and participate in the 1975 spring offensive. During the last days of the war, 1st Corps had a major role in the attack on Saigon, in which it was assigned the mission of capturing the headquarters of the Joint General Staff. The corps was awarded the title Hero of the People's Armed Forces (Anh hùng Lực lượng vũ trang nhân dân) in 1985.

Development process 
According to the decision of the Ministry of Defence, the organisational structure of the Corps includes: Corps Command. Three corps agencies: the General Staff, the Political Bureau, and the Logistics Department. Units upon establishment: 308th Infantry Division, 312th Division, 320B Infantry Division (later changed to 390th Division), 367th Air Defense Division, 202nd Tank-Armored Brigade, 45th Brigade Artillery, 299th Engineer Brigade and 140th Information Regiment.

On March 15, 1975, while the Battle of Ban Me Thuot was gaining a crushing victory. 1st Corps was ordered to move into Southern Vietnam ready to fight. In just 12 days and nights, the entire formation of the corps (except for the 308th Division soldier who remained in Northern Vietnam on diversionary duty), had traveled over a distance of 1,789 km from the North to the South along the Ho Chi Minh trail, in time to enter the war zone directly participated in the fighting in the North of Saigon. After that, the corps moved into the battlefield along Highway 1 - Road 9 - through Lao Bao to Laotian territory - back to Kon Tum along route 14 through Buon Ma Thuot, on April 14, 1975 to Dong Xoai - Phuoc Long prepares for the final battle. During the Ho Chi Minh Campaign, Army Corps 1 received the task of attacking from the North of Saigon, encircling and destroying the enemy in Phú Lợi, Bến Cát, Bình Dương, Lai Khê, Tân Uyên; prevent the Army of the Republic of Vietnam's 5th Division from withdrawing to the inner city and neutralize this unit; attacked and captured the Chief of the Joint General Staff, the army command posts in Gò Vấp, Bình Thạnh; organized a combined attack force with other corps at the Independence Palace. Due to the urgent need to march from the North by all means of water, land and air. 1st Corps started the attack a day later than the other units.

Organisation
The command structure of 1st Corps consists of the High Command (Bộ tư lệnh), the Staff of 1st Corps (Bộ tham mưu), the Political Department (Cục chính trị), the Department of Logistics (Cục hậu cần) and the Department of Technique (Cục kỹ thuật). The combat forces of the corps include the 308th Division, 312th Division, 390th Division, 367th Air Defence Division, 202nd Tank Brigade, 45th Artillery Brigade and 299th Engineer Brigade.

  308th Division
  312th Division
  390th Division

Commanders

Notes

References
 

Corps of the People's Army of Vietnam
Military units and formations established in 1973
Hero of the People's Armed Forces